Simon ben Koseba or Cosiba (died 135 CE), commonly known as Bar Kokhba, was a Jewish military leader who led the Bar Kokhba revolt against the Roman Empire in 132 CE. The revolt established a three-year-long independent Jewish state in which Bar Kokhba ruled as nasi ("prince"). Some of the rabbinic scholars in his time imagined him to be the long-expected Messiah. Bar Kokhba was killed by the Romans in the fortified town of Betar.

Name

Documented name
Documents discovered in the 20th century in the Cave of Letters give his original name, with variations: Simeon bar Kosevah, Bar Kosevaʾ‎ or Ben Kosevaʾ‎. It is probable that his original name was Bar Koseba. The name may indicate that his father or his place of origin was named Koseva(h), with Khirbet Kuwayzibah being a likely nominee for identification; Others, namely Emil Schürer, think the surname may have been an indication of his place of birth, in the village known as Chozeba (maybe Chezib) but might as well be a general family name.

Nicknames
During the revolt, the Jewish sage Rabbi Akiva regarded Simon as the Jewish messiah; the Talmud records his statement that the Star Prophecy verse from Numbers 24:17: "There shall come a star out of Jacob" referred to him, based on identification of the Hebrew word for star, kokhav, and his name, bar Kozeva. The name Bar Kokhba, which references this statement of Akiva, does not appear in the Talmud, but only in ecclesiastical sources, until the 16th century. The Jerusalem Talmud (Taanit 4:5) mentions him by the name of Bar Kozeva.

Revolt leader

Background
Despite the devastation wrought by the Romans during the First Jewish–Roman War (66–73 CE), which left the population and countryside in ruins, a series of laws passed by Roman Emperors provided the incentive for the second rebellion. Based on the delineation of years in Eusebius' Chronicon (whose Latin translation is known as the Chronicle of Jerome) the Jewish revolt began under the Roman governor Tineius (Tynius) Rufus in the 16th year of Hadrian's reign, or what was equivalent to the 4th year of the 227th Olympiad. Hadrian sent an army to crush the resistance, but it faced a strong opponent, since Bar Kokhba, as the recognised leader of Israel, punished any Jew who refused to join his ranks. Two and a half years later, after the war had ended, the Roman emperor Hadrian barred Jews from entering Ælia Capitolina, the pagan city he had built on the ruins of Jewish Jerusalem. The name Aelia was derived from one of the emperor's names, Aelius. According to Philostorgius, this was done so that its former Jewish inhabitants "might not find in the name of the city a pretext for claiming it as their country."

Overview
For many Jews of the time, this turn of events was heralded as the long hoped for Messianic Age. The Romans fared very poorly during the initial revolt facing a unified Jewish force, in contrast to the First Jewish-Roman War, where Flavius Josephus records three separate Jewish armies fighting each other for control of the Temple Mount during the three weeks after the Romans had breached Jerusalem's walls and were fighting their way to the center. Being outnumbered and taking heavy casualties, the Romans adopted a scorched earth policy which reduced and demoralised the Judean populace, slowly grinding away at the will of the Judeans to sustain the war.

During the final phase of the war, Bar Kokhba took up refuge in the fortress of Betar. The Romans eventually captured it after laying siege to the city.

The Jerusalem Talmud makes several claims considered as non-historical by modern scholarship. One such claim is that the duration of the siege was of three and half years, although the war itself lasted, according to the same author, two and half years. Another part of the Talmudic narrative is that the Romans killed all the defenders except for one Jewish youth, Simeon ben Gamliel II, whose life was spared. According to Cassius Dio, 580,000 Jews were killed in overall war operations across the country, and some 50 fortified towns and 985 villages razed to the ground, while the number of those who perished by famine, disease and fire was beyond finding out.

Outcome and aftermath
So costly was the Roman victory, that the Emperor Hadrian, when reporting to the Roman Senate, did not see fit to begin with the customary greeting "If you and your children are healthy, it is well; I and the legions are healthy."

In the aftermath of the war, Hadrian consolidated the older political units of Judaea, Galilee and Samaria into the new province of Syria Palaestina, which is commonly interpreted as an attempt to complete the disassociation with Judaea.

Archaeological findings
In the late 20th and 21st century, new information about the revolt has come to light, from the discovery of several collections of letters, some possibly by Bar Kokhba himself, in the Cave of Letters overlooking the Dead Sea. These letters can now be seen at the Israel Museum.

Ideology and language
According to Israeli archaeologist Yigael Yadin, Bar Kokhba tried to revive Hebrew and make Hebrew the official language of the Jews as part of his messianic ideology. In A Roadmap to the Heavens: An Anthropological Study of Hegemony among Priests, Sages, and Laymen (Judaism and Jewish Life) by Sigalit Ben-Zion (page 155), Yadin remarked: "it seems that this change came as a result of the order that was given by Bar Kokhba, who wanted to revive the Hebrew language and make it the official language of the state."

Character

Talmud
Simon bar Kokhba is portrayed in rabbinic literature as being somewhat irrational and irascible in conduct. The Talmud says that he presided over an army of Jewish insurgents numbering some 200,000, but had compelled its young recruits to prove their valor by each man chopping off one of his own fingers. The Sages of Israel complained to him why he marred the people of Israel with such blemishes. Whenever he would go forth into battle, he was reported as saying: "O Master of the universe, there is no need for you to assist us [against our enemies], but do not embarrass us either!" It is also said of him that he killed his maternal uncle, Rabbi Elazar Hamudaʻi, after suspecting him of collaborating with the enemy, thereby forfeiting Divine protection, which led to the destruction of Betar in which Bar Kokhba himself also perished.

Hadrian is thought to have personally supervised the closing military operations in the siege against Betar. When the Roman army eventually took the city, soldiers carried Bar Kokhba's severed head to Hadrian, and when Hadrian asked who it was that killed him, a Samaritan replied that he had killed him. When Hadrian requested that they bring the severed head (Latin:protome) of the slain victim close to him that he might see it, Hadrian observed that a serpent was wrapped around the head. Hadrian then replied: "Had it not been for God who killed him, who would have been able to kill him!?"

Eusebius
Bar Kokhba was a ruthless leader, punishing any Jew who refused to join his ranks. According to Eusebius' Chronicon, he severely punished the sect of Christians with death by different means of torture for their refusal to fight against the Romans.

In popular culture

Since the end of the nineteenth century, Bar-Kochba has been the subject of numerous works of art (dramas, operas, novels, etc.), including:
  (1858), a Hebrew novel by Kalman Schulman
 Bar Kokhba (1882), a Yiddish operetta by Abraham Goldfaden (mus. and libr.). The work was written in the wake of pogroms against Jews following the 1881 assassination of Czar Alexander II of Russia.
 Bar Kokhba (1884), a Hebrew drama by Yehudah Loeb Landau
 The Son of a Star (1888), an English novel by Benjamin Ward Richardson
  (1903), a French opera by Camille Erlanger (mus.) and Catulle Mendes (libr.)
 Bar-Kochba (1905), a German opera by Stanislaus Suda (mus.) and Karl Jonas (libr.)
  (1910), a Yiddish novel by David Pinsky
 Bar-Kokhba (1929), a Hebrew drama by Shaul Tchernichovsky
 Bar-Kokhba (1939), a Yiddish drama by Shmuel Halkin
 Bar-Kokhba (1941), a Yiddish novel by Abraham Raphael Forsyth
  (1943), a Hungarian drama by Lajos Szabolcsi
  (1952), a Danish novel by Poul Borchsenius
 Prince of Israel (1952), an English novel by Elias Gilner
 Bar-Kokhba (1953), a Hebrew novel by Joseph Opatoshu
 Son of a Star (1969), an English novel by Andrew Meisels
 If I Forget Thee (1983), an English novel by Brenda Lesley Segal
  (A Star in Its Course: The Life of Bar-Kokhba) (1988), a Hebrew novel by S.J. Kreutner
  (1988), a Hebrew novel by Yeroshua Perah
 My Husband, Bar Kokhba (2003), an English novel by Andrew Sanders
 Knowledge Columns (2014), an American rap song by Dopey Ziegler
Son Of A Star (2015), song by Israeli metal band Desert

Another operetta on the subject of Bar Kokhba was written by the Russian-Jewish emigre composer Yaacov Bilansky Levanon in Palestine in the 1920s.

John Zorn's Masada Chamber Ensemble recorded an album called Bar Kokhba, showing a photograph of the Letter of Bar Kokhba to Yeshua, son of Galgola on the cover.

The Bar Kokhba game

According to a legend, during his reign, Bar Kokhba was once presented a mutilated man, who had his tongue ripped out and hands cut off. Unable to talk or write, the victim was incapable of telling who his attackers were. Thus, Bar Kokhba decided to ask simple questions to which the dying man was able to nod or shake his head with his last movements; the murderers were consequently apprehended.

In Hungary, this legend spawned the "Bar Kokhba game", in which one of two players comes up with a word or object, while the other must figure it out by asking questions only to be answered with "yes" or "no". The questioner usually asks first if it is a living being, if not, if it is an object, if not, it is surely an abstraction. The verb kibarkochbázni ("to Bar Kochba out") became a common language verb meaning "retrieving information in an extremely tedious way".

See also
 Bar Kokhba Revolt coinage
 Bar Kokhba weights
 Jewish Messiah claimants
 Lukuas

Notes

References

Bibliography

 Eck, W. 'The Bar Kokhba Revolt: the Roman point of view' in the Journal of Roman Studies 89 (1999) 76ff.
 Goodblatt, David; Pinnick, Avital; Schwartz Daniel: Historical Perspectives: From the Hasmoneans to the Bar Kohkba Revolt In Light of the Dead Sea Scrolls: Boston: Brill: 2001: 
 Marks, Richard: The Image of Bar Kokhba in Traditional Jewish Literature: False Messiah and National Hero: University Park: Pennsylvania State University Press: 1994: 
 Reznick, Leibel: The Mystery of Bar Kokhba: Northvale: J.Aronson: 1996: 
 Schafer, Peter: The Bar Kokhba War Reconsidered: Tübingen: Mohr: 2003: 
 Ussishkin, David: "Archaeological Soundings at Betar, Bar-Kochba's Last Stronghold", in: Tel Aviv. Journal of the Institute of Archaeology of Tel Aviv University 20 (1993) 66ff.
 Yadin, Yigael: Bar Kokhba: The Rediscovery of the Legendary Hero of the Last Jewish Revolt Against Imperial Rome: London: Weidenfeld and Nicolson: 1971:

Further reading

External links

 Video Lecture on Bar Kochba by Henry Abramson
 Cave of Letters on Nova
 The Bar-Kokhba Revolt (132–135 C.E.) by Shira Schoenberg
 Bar Kochba with links to all sources (livius.org)
  Genealogy of the House of David- Simon bar Koziba

Year of birth missing
135 deaths
Bar Kokhba revolt
Jewish messiah claimants
Jewish military personnel
Jewish royalty
Jews and Judaism in the Roman Empire
2nd-century monarchs in the Middle East
2nd-century Jews